This article provides information on candidates who stood for the 1919 Australian federal election. The election was held on 13 December 1919.

By-elections, appointments and defections

By-elections and appointments
On 30 June 1917, William Spence (Nationalist) was elected to succeed Charles Howroyd (Nationalist) as the member for Darwin.
On 27 October 1917, Edmund Jowett (Nationalist) was elected to succeed Carty Salmon (Nationalist) as the member for Grampians.
On 11 May 1918, Stanley Bruce (Nationalist) was elected to succeed Sir William Irvine (Nationalist) as the member for Flinders.
On 26 October 1918, Edwin Corboy (Labor) was elected to succeed Sir John Forrest (Nationalist) as the member for Swan.
On 14 December 1918, William Gibson (VFU) was elected to succeed Chester Manifold (Nationalist) as the member for Corangamite.
On 15 January 1919, Edward Mulcahy (Nationalist) was appointed as a Tasmanian Senator to replace James Long (Labor).
On 20 September 1919, William Hill (VFU) was elected to succeed Albert Palmer (Nationalist) as the member for Echuca.

Defections
 Labor MP Michael Considine (Barrier) was expelled from the party in 1919 and contested the election as an Independent, although he was not opposed by Labor.
 Nationalist MP Bruce Smith (Parkes) lost pre-selection and contested the election as an Independent.
 Nationalist MP Jens Jensen (Bass) lost pre-selection and contested the election as an Independent.
Several Nationalist members also received endorsement from the state Country parties. These included William Fleming (Robertson) and John Chanter (Riverina) in New South Wales, Edmund Jowett (Grampians) in Victoria and Henry Gregory (Dampier) in Western Australia.

Seat changes
The Nationalist member for Hume (NSW), Franc Falkiner, contested the Senate for the Farmers' and Settlers' Association.
The Nationalist member for Darwin (Tas), William Spence, contested Batman (Vic).
The Labor member for West Sydney (NSW), Con Wallace, agreed to stand aside in his safe seat to allow Queensland Premier T. J. Ryan to enter federal politics; he contested the Nationalist-held seat of Nepean instead.

Retiring Members and Senators

Nationalist
 Percy Abbott MP (New England, NSW)
 Willie Kelly MP (Wentworth, NSW)
 Richard Orchard MP (Nepean, NSW)
 Hugh Sinclair MP (Moreton, Qld)
Senator John Shannon (SA)

House of Representatives
Sitting members at the time of the election are shown in bold text. Successful candidates are highlighted in the relevant colour. Where there is possible confusion, an asterisk (*) is also used.

New South Wales

Queensland

South Australia

Tasmania

Victoria

Western Australia

Senate
Sitting Senators are shown in bold text. Tickets that elected at least one Senator are highlighted in the relevant colour. Successful candidates are identified by an asterisk (*).

New South Wales
Three seats were up for election. The Labor Party was defending three seats. Nationalist Senators Edward Millen, Herbert Pratten and Josiah Thomas were not up for re-election.

Queensland
Three seats were up for election. The Labor Party was defending three seats. Nationalist Senators Thomas Crawford, Harry Foll and Matthew Reid were not up for re-election.

South Australia
Three seats were up for election. The Labor Party was defending two seats. The Nationalist Party was defending one seat. Nationalist Senators Robert Guthrie, James Rowell and William Senior were not up for re-election.

Tasmania
Four seats were up for election. Uniquely, one of these was for a vacancy extending only until the new Senate assumed its place on 1 July 1920; this was the remainder of James Long's term that had been filled in the interim by Edward Mulcahy. The fourth elected senator would thus serve only until 1 July 1920, whereupon his term would expire. The Labor Party was defending three seats. The Nationalist Party was defending one seat. Nationalist Senators Thomas Bakhap, John Earle and John Keating were not up for re-election.

Victoria
Three seats were up for election. The Labor Party was defending three seats. Nationalist Senators William Bolton, George Fairbairn and William Plain were not up for re-election.

Western Australia
Three seats were up for election. The Labor Party was defending three seats. Nationalist Senators Richard Buzacott, Hugh de Largie and George Henderson were not up for re-election.

See also
 1919 Australian federal election
 Members of the Australian House of Representatives, 1917–1919
 Members of the Australian House of Representatives, 1919–1922
 Members of the Australian Senate, 1917–1920
 Members of the Australian Senate, 1920–1923
 List of political parties in Australia

References
Adam Carr's Election Archive - House of Representatives 1919
Adam Carr's Election Archive - Senate 1919

1919 in Australia
Candidates for Australian federal elections